Tolibut, also known as 3-(p-tolyl)-4-aminobutyric acid (or β-(4-methylphenyl)-GABA), is drug that was developed in Russia. It is an analogue of γ-aminobutyric acid (GABA) (that is, a GABA analogue) and is the 4-methyl analogue of phenibut, and is also an analogue of baclofen where the 4-chloro substitution has been replaced with a 4-methyl substitution. Tolibut has been described as possessing analgesic, tranquilizing, and neuroprotective properties. It is not fully clear as to whether the drug was ever approved or used medically in Russia, though it may have been.

See also
 4-Fluorophenibut

References

Abandoned drugs
Analgesics
Anxiolytics
GABA analogues
Neuroprotective agents
Russian drugs
4-Tolyl compounds